Josiah Bronson (born July 3, 1997) is an American football defensive end for the Miami Dolphins of the National Football League (NFL). He played college football at Washington and signed with New Orleans Saints as an undrafted free agent in 2021.

College career
Bronson began his college career at Temple and redshirted his true freshman season after breaking his ankle in training camp. He did not play in any games as a redshirt freshman and transferred to Washington at the end of the season following the departure of Temple head coach Matt Rhule.

Bronson joined the Washington Huskies as a walk-on and did not see any playing time in his first season with the team. As a redshirt junior, he played in 12 games and had 11 tackles with one tackle for loss and one sack. Bronson was awarded a scholarship during spring practice after the season. He became a starter during his redshirt senior season and finished the year with 23 tackles, four tackles for loss, and two sacks. Bronson was granted a sixth season of eligibility by the NCAA for the 2020 season.

Professional career

New Orleans Saints
Bronson was signed by the New Orleans Saints as an undrafted free agent on May 2, 2021. He was waived during final roster cuts on August 31, 2021, but was signed to the team's practice squad the next day. Bronson was elevated to the active roster on October 26, 2021, for the team's week 7 game against the Seattle Seahawks and made his NFL debut in the game. He was signed to the Saints' active roster on November 20, 2021. He was waived on December 14, 2021.

Cleveland Browns
Bronson was claimed off waivers by Cleveland Browns on December 15, 2021. Bronson was waived by the Browns on December 30, 2021.

Dallas Cowboys
On January 5, 2022, Bronson was signed to the Dallas Cowboys practice squad. He signed a futures contract on January 19. He was waived on August 30, 2022.

Miami Dolphins
On September 5, 2022, Bronson signed with the practice squad of the Miami Dolphins. He signed a reserve/future contract on January 16, 2023.

References

External links
Temple Owls bio
Washington Huskies bio
New Orleans Saints bio

1997 births
American football defensive tackles
Cleveland Browns players
Dallas Cowboys players
Kentwood High School (Washington) alumni
Living people
Miami Dolphins players
New Orleans Saints players
Players of American football from Washington (state)
Temple Owls football players
Washington Huskies football players